Zhivko Milanov (born 15 July 1984) is a Bulgarian former professional footballer who is currently an assistant manager of Lokomotiv Sofia.

He was primarily deployed as a right back, but when needed he could also operate on the left side. Milanov was capped 28 times for the Bulgarian national team.

Milanov spent the majority of his playing career at Levski Sofia, but he also had several stints abroad at Vaslui, Tom Tomsk and APOEL.

After ending his playing career, in 2021 he became an assistant manager of Levski, later also spending some time as head coach of the club.

Career

Levski Sofia
Milanov made his league debut in 2003. With Levski Sofia he reached the quarter finals of UEFA Cup in 2005–06. Next season, Levski Sofia reached the group-stage of UEFA Champions League, becoming the first Bulgarian team to do so.

He became a Champion of Bulgaria in 2009.

Vaslui
Milanov joined Vaslui on 14 January 2010 on a -year contract. The deal was reported by media to be worth $350,000. He was seen as the perfect substitute for Vaslui's captain Buhuș, whose long-term injury would keep him out from the field for the rest of the season. He made his league debut against Gaz Metan Mediaş, wearing the number 20 for Vaslui. He did not missed a single match for his new team, and helped Vaslui finishing third in Liga I, and reaching the Romanian Cup final, eventually lost at the penalty shootout. After Buhuș's departure, he established himself as Vaslui's first-choice right back.

On 23 July 2010, in Liga I's opening match, Milanov received his first red card since his arrival in Vaslui. Following Luz's long term-injury and Bălace's bad shape, Milanov was sent to play on the left side. However, because of Papp's unsuccessful try out on the right side, Milanov was sent back on his favourite position. In his second season in Vaslui, he ended third in Liga I, after a long battle, between Oţelul Galaţi, Poli Timişoara and SC Vaslui, for their first championship.

On 23 July 2011, Milanov received his second red card, in Vaslui's opening match against Rapid București. On 19 August, he scored his first goal for Vaslui, against Sparta Prague helping his team qualify for the first time to the UEFA Europa League's Group Stages.

Tom Tomsk
After his contract with Vaslui expired, Milanov joined Russian Premier League club Tom Tomsk on a free transfer on 24 June 2013. He signed a two-year contract.

Return to Levski Sofia
Milanov returned to Levski Sofia in early September 2015 and played for the Blues during the autumn part of the 2015–16 A Group, receiving praise for his performance.

APOEL
On 30 December 2015, Milanov signed an 18-month contract with Cypriot First Division champions APOEL. He made his debut on 10 January 2016, playing the full 90 minutes in APOEL's 2–1 away victory against Aris Limassol for the Cypriot First Division. A few months after joining APOEL, he crowned champion as his team managed to win the Cypriot First Division title for a fourth time in the row.

On 2 March 2017, Milanov signed a two-year contract extension with APOEL, running until 31 May 2019.

Third stint at Levski Sofia and retirement
After agreeing with APOEL to rescind his contract, Milanov returned again to Levski Sofia. On 11 February 2019 he signed a 1,5-year contract with the club. 

On 23 June 2020, Milanov played his last professional match against Lokomotiv Plovdiv in a semi-final Cup tie, finishing 0-0. After the match, he stated that a lung disease made him retire on the age of 34.

International career
Milanov started playing for the Bulgarian national team in 2006, and has been capped 28 times during his international career. He announced his retirement from the national team on 21 March 2017, at the age of 32.

Career statistics

Club

International

Honours
Levski Sofia
A PFG (3): 2005–06, 2006–07, 2008–09
Bulgarian Cup (3): 2002–03, 2004–05, 2006–07
Bulgarian Supercup (3): 2005, 2007, 2009
APOEL
Cypriot First Division (4): 2015–16, 2016–17, 2017–18, 2018–19

References

External links
 
 APOEL official profile
 Profile at LevskiSofia.info
 
 

1984 births
Living people
Footballers from Sofia
Bulgarian footballers
Bulgaria international footballers
Association football defenders
First Professional Football League (Bulgaria) players
Liga I players
Russian Premier League players
Cypriot First Division players
PFC Levski Sofia players
FC Vaslui players
FC Tom Tomsk players
APOEL FC players
Bulgarian expatriate footballers
Expatriate footballers in Romania
Expatriate footballers in Russia
Bulgarian expatriate sportspeople in Romania
Bulgarian expatriate sportspeople in Russia
Bulgarian expatriate sportspeople in Cyprus